Na Byung-yul (born 5 January 1985) is a South Korean football midfielder, who currently plays for Indonesian club Persita Tangerang.

Club career
Following completion of his university studies, Na joined K-League club Busan I'Park FC. He was then loaned to the National Police Agency FC while he fulfilled his military obligations.  Following the completion of his military service, he returned to Busan, but shortly thereafter was released by the club. Na moved to the Indonesian club Persik Kediri for the 2009–10 Indonesia Super League season.  After Persik Kediri was relegated to the Liga Indonesia Premier Division at the conclusion of the season, Na shifted to Batavia United FC, specifically formed to participate in the newly established 2011 Liga Primer Indonesia. Currently, he is active in 2013 Indonesia Super League Persita Tangerang.

National team 
Na was called up to the South Korea U-19 squad in October 2004, which was due to play a friendly against Japan. However, he ultimately was not used in the match.

References

External links 

1985 births
Living people
Association football midfielders
South Korean footballers
Busan IPark players
Expatriate footballers in Indonesia
Liga 1 (Indonesia) players
Sportspeople from Busan